Clubul Sportiv Municipal Alexandria, commonly known as CSM Alexandria or simply as Alexandria, is a professional women's basketball team from Alexandria, Romania. The team plays in the Liga Națională.

The team was in the final of the Romanian Cup in 2009.

In the summer of 2018 CSBT Alexandria was moved to the sports club of Alexandria, CSM Alexandria, club which was founded in the same summer.

Honours
 Romanian Cup
Runners-up (1): 2008–09

Current roster

References

External links
 Eurobasket 
 frbaschet.ro 

Alexandria, Romania
Basketball teams in Romania
Women's basketball teams in Romania
Basketball teams established in 1986
1986 establishments in Romania